Schanck may refer to:

John Schanck (1750–1823), captain in the New Jersey Militia during the American Revolutionary War
Cape Schanck, locality in the Australian state of Victoria
Cape Schanck Lighthouse, built in 1859 as the second coastal lighthouse in the Australian state of Victoria
Daniel S. Schanck Observatory, former astronomical observatory on the Queens Campus of Rutgers University in New Brunswick, New Jersey, United States

See also
Schack
Schank
Schenk
Shank (disambiguation)
Shenk
Shanklin